Svoboda Factory Club (Russian:Клуб фабрики "Свобода"), conceived as Chemists Trade Union Club (Клуб Химиков), also known as Maxim Gorky Palace of Culture (Дворец культуры имени Горького), is a listed memorial avant-garde building in Moscow, Russia, designed by Konstantin Melnikov in 1927 and completed in 1929. It is located at 41A, Vyatskaya Street, in Savyolovsky District.

Evolution of design

Upon his return from Paris in 1925 and completion of Bakhmetevsky Bus Garage, Melnikov enjoyed a rush of commissions from trade unions, who launched a nationwide campaign to build workers' clubs in 1926. After negotiations with the Communal Workers Unions, who accepted his concept for Rusakov Workers' Club and rejected his Zuev Workers' Club (awarded to Ilya Golosov), Melnikov was employed by the Chemists' Union who planned to build one large (Svoboda Factory) and one small (Frunze Factory) club.

Initial concept for Svoboda Club was a flat elliptical tube raised above ground floor pilotis.

Architecture

In the age of total steel rationing, the tubular concept was immediately blocked. Melnikov had to minimize the use of steel to the bare minimum (main span girders).

Preservation

As of March, 2007, Svoboda Club is in quite good exterior condition. The building is painted to its original white-red color scheme. The only difference with 1920s photographs is the lack of color accent around end block windows (originally, there was a third color - a paler shade of red). 

2007 photographs

References
Russian: 2006 biography of Melnikov by Selim Khan-Magomedov: Хан-Магомедов, С.О., "Константин Мельников", М, 2006 
English: Khan-Magomedov, Selim, "Pioneers of Soviet Architecture: The Search for New Solutions in the 1920s and 1930s", Thames and Hudson Ltd, 

Buildings and structures in Moscow
Russian avant-garde
Constructivist architecture
Buildings and structures completed in 1929
Modernist architecture in Russia
Cultural heritage monuments of regional significance in Moscow